The American post-grunge band Smile Empty Soul was previously known as Hecklers Veto. During this time they released an eP titled Smile Empty Soul, copies of which were passed out at local rock shows by the band. One fan recalls receiving one at a local Papa Roach show. Quantities of the EP are very rare and only three copies are known to exist on CD, and one cassette version. The cassette version has completely different tracks from the CD version and was only produced by J. Danielsen, both sides of cassette are the same. 
The track length for the cassette version is unknown.

However, the CD EP is available via digital download,
There is currently no way to hear the cassette songs.

The CD album was available for free download as a "reward bonus" for Groupees Smile Empty Soul: Feeds The Hunger if 2,500 meals were reached ($1 donation = 1 meal). 2,232 meals were reached resulting in no "reward bonus" or no free download.

None of the tracks released on this album have ever been released on Smile Empty Soul albums.

Track listing 
CD Edition

Cassette Edition

Personnel
 Sean Danielsen – vocals, guitar
 Ryan Martin – bass guitar
 Derek Gledhill – drums
 R. Boggs, J. Danielsen & S. Glenn - producers

References

1999 debut EPs
Smile Empty Soul albums
Dyspathy Records albums